Bihar State Shia Wakf Board is an agency of Government of Bihar constituted in 2001 for better administration of Wakf in the state of Bihar in India.

References

2001 establishments in Bihar
State agencies of Bihar
Shia Islam in India